Kubrat was the ruler of the Onogur–Bulgars, credited with establishing the confederation of Old Great Bulgaria in ca. 632. His name derived from the Turkic words qobrat — "to gather", or qurt, i.e. "wolf".

Origin
In the Nominalia of the Bulgarian khans Kubrat is mentioned as Kurt, being a member of the Dulo clan and reigning for 60 years having succeeded Gostun of the Ermi clan.

Bulgars were Turkic nomadic people, who participated in the 5th-century Hunnic confederation. Upon Attila's death, the tribes that later formed the Bulgars had retreated east into the Black Sea-Caspian Steppe. The western Bulgar tribes joined the Avar Khaganate, while the eastern Bulgars came under the Western Turkic Khaganate by the end of the 6th century.

Theophanes the Confessor called him "king of the Onogundur Huns". Patriarch Nikephoros I (758–828) called Kubrat "lord of the Onuğundur" and "ruler of the Onuğundur–Bulğars". John of Nikiu ( 696) called him "chief of the Huns". D. Hupchick identified Kubrat as "Onogur", P. Golden as "Oğuro-Bulğar", H. J. Kim as "Bulgar Hunnic/Hunnic Bulgar". According to H. J. Kim the Onogundur/Onogur were evidently part of the Bulgar confederation.

History

Kubrat spent his early life at the Byzantine Empire imperial palace in Constantinople. As the 7th-century Byzantine historian John of Nikiu narrates:

Whether he was a child or a young adult during his time in Constantinople is unclear. The exact time of this event is also unknown but probably coincided with the reign of Emperor Heraclius (r. 610–641). His or Organa's conversion to Christianity is placed circa 619 AD. It seems that young Kubrat was part of the pre-planned coalition, initiated by Heraclius or Organa, against the Sasanian–Avar alliance. This coincides with other alliances by Heraclius with steppe peoples, all in the interest of saving Constantinople.

Kubrat, in 635, according to Nikephoros I, "ruler of the Onoğundur–Bulğars, successfully revolted against the Avars and concluded a treaty with Heraclius". The state Old Great Bulgaria (Magna Bulgaria) was formed. Kubrat died "when Konstantinos was in the West", somewhere during the reign of Constans II (641–668).

According to Nikephoros I, Kubrat instructed his five sons (Batbayan, Kotrag, Asparukh, two others unmentioned are considered to be Kuber and Alcek) to "never separate their place of dwelling from one another, so that by being in concordance with one another, their power might thrive". However, the loose tribal union broke up under internal tensions and especially Khazars pressure from the East.

Kubrat's death 
The Pereshchepina Treasure was discovered in 1912 by Ukrainian peasants in the vicinity of Poltava, in village Malo Pereshchepyne. It consists of diverse gold and silver objects of total weight of over 50 kg from the migration period, including three rings with monograms, which led scholars to identify the site as Kubrat's grave. The ring A was inscribed in Greek XOBPATOY and ring C was inscribed XOBPATOY ПATPIKIOY, indicating the dignity of Patrikios (Patrician) that he had achieved in the Byzantine world. The treasure indicates close relation between the Bulgars and Byzantines, e.g. the bracelets were influenced or made by a Byzantine goldsmith. The first treasure coins were issued after 629, by Heraclius, and the last c. 650 AD, by Constans II, which can be associated with the upcoming Khazar conquest.

Kubrat is mentioned in the Nominalia of the Bulgarian khans, according which his birth is given the sign of the ox (shegor vechem) in the Bulgar calendar. It also says his rule was 60 years. Presuming lifespan is meant, this would place his death in 653 or 665 AD. Thus, the date of Kubrat's death according historical and archaeological sources is placed between 650 and 665 AD. Correspondingly his birth could have been between 590 and 615 if Somogyi's theory is correct.

Legacy
Kubrat Knoll on Livingston Island in the South Shetland Islands, Antarctica is named after Kubrat of Great Bulgaria.

Kubrat was portrayed by Vasil Mihaylov in the 1981 Bulgarian movie Aszparuh, directed by Ludmil Staikov.

See also
Utigurs
Kutrigurs

Annotations

.The rings of Pereschepina treasure have been deciphered in 1984 by the German archaeologust Joachim Werner (archaeologist).

References

Sources

Further reading

Львова, З.А., 2000. Погребения в Малой Перешчепине и Вознесенке и Кубрат, каган Великой Болгарии. Stratum plus, 5, pp. 145–160.
Lambrev, K., Легендата за кан Кубрат и неговите синове. Исторически Преглед.
Георгиев, П., 2001. Столицата на хан Кубрат. Трудове на катедрата по История и богословие (Шуменски университет), 4, pp. 17–39.
Вернер, И., 1985. Захоронение в Малом Перещепине и Кубрат, хан болгарский. Софийские новости (газета), 5.
Семёнов, И.Г., 2013. К истории Унногундурского государства. Византийский временник, 72, pp. 45–67.
Комар, О.В., 2001. Кубрат" і "Велика Булгарія": проблеми джерелознавчого аналізу. Сходознавство.–2001.–Вип, pp. 13–14.
Zalesskaia, V.N., 2006. Zlatoto na khan Kubrat. Pereshchepinskoto săkrovishte.
Todorov-Berberski, H., 1997. Great Bulgaria under Khan Kubrat-Some disputed issues from a linguistic perspective (9th century Bulgaria). BULGARIAN HISTORICAL REVIEW-REVUE BULGARE D HISTOIRE, (2-3), pp. 180–204.
Baba, S.M., 2013. Origin and History of Volga Bulghars: A Study of the Journey from Central Asia to Volga-Ural Region and the Formation of Volga Bulgharia. Journal of Asian Civilizations, 36(1), p. 189.
1983: Kurt, Kubrat ili Kurt Kubrat [Kurt, Kubrat oder Kurt Kubrat]. In: Bälgarski Ezik 33. S. 341-342.

External links 

 The Pereshchepina Treasure
 Kubrat Ring at Hermitage Museum

Year of death unknown
Monarchs of the Bulgars
Christian monarchs
7th-century Christians
7th-century monarchs in Europe
7th-century Bulgarian monarchs
Patricii
Turkic rulers
Dulo clan